Kestrel is an American bicycle brand which specializes in high-end bikes for triathlons and road racing. Kestrel has been owned by Advanced Sports International since 2007.

Aegis pioneered carbon fiber frame design with the world's first all-carbon bicycle frame in 1986, based again on the first-ever Finite Element Analysis (FEA) of bicycle frame structure conducted in 1986. With strongly opposed manufacturing philosophies, AEGIS parted ways with members intent on producing frames utilizing the monocoque/one piece construction technique. While the “other half” went West to establish Cycle Composites d/b/a Kestrel.  Kestrel set new standards again in 1989, with the launch of the first carbon fork and the debut of the KM40 Airfoil, the first true aero triathlon frame.
Carbon framesets by better-known, mainstream manufacturers such as Giant and, most notably, Trek (with its OCLV frames), have been directly influenced by Kestrel design principles.

Kestrel builds monocoque frames rather than more traditional tube and lug designs. This has always meant that Kestrels have tended to have a very fluid, curved appearance. However, more recent designs from the company have been more angular due to an increased desire to minimise wind resistance.

Timeline 
 1986: Kestrel is formed from a group of Aegis employees together with aerospace materials experts
 1986: Kestrel's first bicycle, the Kestrel 4000 road bike, is released, featuring all-carbon, fully aerodynamic frame design
 1986: Kestrel is the first in the industry to introduce bladder-molded monocoque carbon structures.
 1988: The company unveils the "Nitro" full-suspension mountain bike after collaboration with Keith Bontrager
 1989: World's first carbon fork, the EMS
 1989: Kestrel is the first company to use higher stiffness, "intermediate modulus" carbon fiber in the 200 EMS. 
 1989: World's first all-carbon triathlon bike, the KM40
 1992: First "modern" seat-tube-less design, the 500SCi, demonstrating the structural flexibility offered by composite construction
 1999: The KM40 Airfoil becomes the first molded, composite frame designed completely with 3-D solid modeling techniques.
 2001: Kestrel introduces its EMS Pro Series, a molded carbon road handlebar.
 2003: Chris McCormack wins his first Ironman aboard a Kestrel and kicks off a superb partnership.
 2007: The RT-700 is recognized by Outside Magazine with "Bike of the Year" honors.
 2008: Kestrel is purchased by Advanced Sports International and joins Fuji & SE under the ASI family.
 2010: Kestrel re-introduces the 4000 triathlon/time trial model.
 2011: Kestrel signs Ironman Champion Andy Potts and up-and-comer Cameron Dye. Members of the GEOX-TMC professional cycling team, including 2009 Giro d'Italia Champion Denis Menchov and 2008 Tour de France Winner Carlos Sastre, use Kestrel as their time trial bike in major international ProTour events - including the Vuelta a Espana, where they helped teammate Juan Jose Cobo win his first grand tour. With five wins aboard his Kestrel 4000, Andy Potts is crowned 2011 Race to the Toyota Cup Series Champion.
 2012: The new Kestrel RT1000 - a bike designed for the endurance rider - hits the market, and the Kestrel 4000 becomes the official TT bike of Champion System, the first ever professional continental cycling team based out of Asia. Cameron Dye is named 2012 Non-Olympic/ITU Athlete of the Year by USA Triathlon, after his career-best, six-win season aboard his 4000 - which also earned him the 2012 Race to the Toyota Cup series title.
 2013: Kestrel launches its brand-new Legend: the lightest frame Kestrel has ever produced.
 2014: Kestrel launch the new improved Talon Road/Triathlon Bike for the 2015 racing season
 2022: On February 1, 2019, the Tiger Group won Advanced Sports at auction.  Kestrel bikes appears to be gone.

References

External links
 Official site  ** Non-functional as of 2022

Cycle manufacturers of the United States
Vehicle manufacturing companies established in 1987
Mountain bike manufacturers
Companies that filed for Chapter 11 bankruptcy in 2018